Apiletria asirica is a moth in the family Autostichidae. It was described by László Anthony Gozmány in 1982. It is found in Saudi Arabia.

References

Moths described in 1982
Apiletria